This is a list of chapters for the manga series Major written and illustrated by Takuya Mitsuda. The manga started in the 1994 issue #33 of Weekly Shōnen Sunday on August 3, 1994. The series finished in the 2010 issue #32 of Weekly Shōnen Sunday published on July 7, 2010. Seventy-eight tankōbon volumes were published by Shogakukan. An anime adaptation based on the manga was produced by Studio Hibari and aired on NHK.



Volume list

References

Major chapter lists